Syed Ibrāhīm Dānishmand was a 16th-century zamindar and Islamic scholar who belonged to the Qadiriyya Sufi order. Well respected during his lifetime, Danishmand was considered an expert in several Islamic and secular subjects. He is believed to be among the first of the Qadiriyya order to have operated and preached in Bengal.

Early life
Born into a Syed family, there are differing opinions on the exact origins of Danishmand, with one suggestion being that he was a native of Persia who migrated to Bengal in the 16th century. It may therefore be possible that he was among the many Syeds who were invited from Central Asia and Persia by the Sultan of Bengal, Alauddin Husain Shah, to aid in the administration of his kingdom.

Alternatively, historian Achyut Charan Choudhury states that he was a great-grandson of the Sufi general Syed Nasiruddin and belonged to the Syeds of Taraf, a land owning family who had had a presence in Bengal since the 13th century.

Life
A prolific writer, Syed Ibrahim was learned in many areas of Islam, though he was particularly focused on tasawwuf (Islamic mysticism). For his knowledge he was styled Danishmand (wise), the title he is most commonly associated with. Under Danishmand’s guidance, the Hindu Rajput nobleman Kalidas Gazdani converted to Islam. Gazdani took the name Sulaiman Khan and later became the father of the famous Isa Khan, who led the Baro-Bhuyan in rebellion against the Mughal Empire.

Syed Ibrahim was also a noted scholar in the Persian and Arabic languages. He was recognised for these achievements by the Emperor of Delhi, from whom he received the title Malik al-Ulama (King of Scholars), as well as also being known by the honorific Qutb-ul-Ashiqeen (Pivot of Lovers). At some point, Danishmand was granted land tax-free in Sonargaon by the Sultan of Bengal, later transferring there from his previous holdings in Taraf in Greater Sylhet. Here, he established a khanqah from which he preached Islam. This practise was continued by his descendants as well as his spiritual successors.

He was eventually buried in Sonargaon, near the 15th century Fath Shah Mosque in a tomb complex he shares with several family members and other Islamic figures. It is considered a sacred site and is commonly visited by devotees.

Family
Many sources state that Syed Ibrahim was married to the Sultan of Bengal's eldest daughter, whose name may have been Raushan Akhtar Banu. However, there is some disagreement about the exact identity of this sultan. Suggestions include the last Ilyas Shahi ruler Jalaluddin Fateh Shah, as well as Alauddin Husain Shah or his son Ghiyasuddin Mahmud Shah, both of the Hussain Shahi dynasty. Through this marriage Syed Ibrahim had four sons: Musa, Isa, Yusuf and Ishaq. He also had a daughter (or granddaughter) named Fatima Bibi, who later became the wife of Isa Khan and the probable mother to his son Musa Khan.

His descendants remained important zamindars in Sonargaon, and among them is the historian Syed Muhammed Taifoor.

References

Bibliography

Bengali Muslim scholars of Islam
Bengali Sufi saints
16th-century births
16th-century Indian Muslims
16th-century deaths
16th-century Bengalis
People from Sonargaon Upazila